Gerhard Gustmann (13 August 1910 – 30 March 1992) was a German rower, born in Bonn, who competed in the 1936 Summer Olympics.

In 1936 he won the gold medal as member of the German boat in the coxed pair competition.

References

External links
 profile

1910 births
1992 deaths
Sportspeople from Bonn
Olympic rowers of Germany
Rowers at the 1936 Summer Olympics
Olympic gold medalists for Germany
Olympic medalists in rowing
German male rowers
Medalists at the 1936 Summer Olympics
European Rowing Championships medalists